Wachi Dam  is a gravity dam located in Kyoto Prefecture in Japan. The dam is used for power production. The construction of the dam was started in 1961 and completed in 1968.

See also
List of dams in Japan

References

Dams in Kyoto Prefecture